This is the discography of American pop rock band Cock Robin.

Albums

Studio albums

Live albums

Compilation albums

Video albums

EPs

Singles

Notes

References

Discographies of American artists
Rock music group discographies
New wave discographies